José Kessel was a Dutch Musician and Composer. A memorial is located in a park in the central square of Santa Ana, El Salvador dedicated to him. He is known for being the teacher of David Granadino.

Dutch musicians